Obukhovsky (masculine), Obukhovskaya (feminine), or Obukhovskoye (neuter) may refer to:
Obukhovsky (surname) (fem. Obukhovskaya), Russian last name
Obukhovsky (inhabited locality) (Obukhovskaya, Obukhovskoye), several inhabited localities in Russia
Obukhovsky Bridge, a bridge across the Fontanka River in St. Petersburg, Russia
Obukhovsky Municipal Okrug, a municipal okrug in Nevsky District of the federal city of St. Petersburg, Russia
Obukhov State Plant (Obukhovsky zavod), a major Russian metallurgy and heavy machine-building plant in St. Petersburg, Russia
Obukhovsky 12"/52 Pattern 1907 gun, a Russian and Soviet naval gun

See also
Bolshoy Obukhovsky Bridge, a bridge across the Neva River in St. Petersburg, Russia